Ziaratgah or Ziyaratgah or Zeyaratgah may refer to several places in Iran:
 Ziaratgah, Gilan
 Ziaratgah, Ardestan, Isfahan Province
 Ziaratgah, Shahreza, Isfahan Province
 Ziaratgah, Rayen, Kerman Province
 Ziaratgah, Shahdad, Kerman Province
 Ziaratgah, South Khorasan
 Ziaratgah-e Bibi Hanna, Fars Province
 Ziaratgah-e Mir Meghdad
 Ziaratgah-e Pir Almas
 Ziaratgah-e Shah Savaran